Claude Jacques Lecourbe (22 February 1759 – 22 October 1815), born in Besançon, was a French general during the French Revolutionary and Napoleonic wars.

Biography
After having studied at a college in Poligny and in Lons-le-Saunier, Lecourbe enlisted in the Regiment of Aquitaine where he served for eight years as an enlisted man. Having been promoted to corporal when the French Revolution started he became commandant of the National Guard of Ruffey-sur-Seille in 1789. He was then given command of the 7th volunteer battalion of the Jura, with which he served in the armies of the Rhine and the Nord. Having been promoted to colonel in 1791 Lecourbe distinguished himself in the battle of Fleurus. Having been promoted to general of brigade in 1794 and to general of division in 1798, he fought against Alexander Suvorov in Switzerland and distinguished himself in the Second Battle of Zurich under André Masséna.

Lecourbe's friendship with Jean-Victor Moreau and his vocal defense of Moreau in the process Georges Cadoudal brought on the enmity of Napoleon Bonaparte which forced his retirement in 1805. After Napoleon's abdication he was made a count by Louis XVIII of France. The count of Artois recalled Lecourbe to active duty in February 1815 and made him inspector-general of the 6th military Division with headquarters in Besançon.

Upon Napoleon's return from exile on Elba, Lecourbe offered him his services and during the Hundred Days he commanded the Army of the Jura (I Corps of Observation), operating in the Jura against Archduke Ferdinand.  With an army of only 8,000 he held the city of Belfort for 15 days against the 40,000 Austrian troops of General Colloredo-Mansfeld, only agreeing a ceasefire on 11 July 1815, a feat which earned him a place of honour in French schoolbooks.  After Louis's second return to the throne, Lecourbe retired and on 22 October 1815 he died in Belfort after a long illness.

Legacy
A statue commemorating him stands in the Place de la Liberté in Lons-le-Saunier, where a street is also named after him.  Streets named in his honour can also be found in Paris and in Besançon.  In Belfort a statue commemorates him as "The glorious defender of the city".

Notes

References
Baradel, Y., et al. (1985). Histoire de Belfort.  Roanne le Coteau: Horvath 1985. (p. 207ff).
 Clausewitz, Carl von (2020). Napoleon Absent, Coalition Ascendant: The 1799 Campaign in Italy and Switzerland, Volume 1. Trans and ed. Nicholas Murray and Christopher Pringle. Lawrence, Kansas: University Press of Kansas. 
 Clausewitz, Carl von (2021). The Coalition Crumbles, Napoleon Returns: The 1799 Campaign in Italy and Switzerland, Volume 2. Trans and ed. Nicholas Murray and Christopher Pringle. Lawrence, Kansas: University Press of Kansas. 
Mullié, C. (1851). Biographie des célébrités militaires des armées de terre et de mer de 1789 à 1850.  Paris: Poignavant

1759 births
1815 deaths
Military personnel from Besançon
French generals
French military personnel of the French Revolutionary Wars
French military personnel of the Napoleonic Wars
Names inscribed under the Arc de Triomphe